Abdus Shakur (25 February 194115 January 2013) was a Bangladeshi litterateur and musicologist. He was awarded Ekushey Padak by the Government of Bangladesh in 2014 for his contribution to language and literature.

Education and career

Shakur completed his BA (honors) and MA degree in English literature from Dhaka University in 1963 and 1964 respectively. In 1980 he earned another master's degree in development economics from the Netherlands.

Shakur started his career at Dhaka University as a lecturer in the English department. Later he joined the Pakistan Civil Service.

In 2000, he retired as a Secretary of the Government of Bangladesh.

Literature
Shakur's book "Bangalir Muktir Gaan" received Bangla Academy Award in 2007.

Awards
 Bangla Academy Literary Award (1979)
 Amiobhushon Award (2003)
 Alokto Sahitya Puroshkar (2008)
 Ekushey Padak (2014)

References

1941 births
2013 deaths
Recipients of Bangla Academy Award
Recipients of the Ekushey Padak
University of Dhaka alumni
Burials at Mirpur Martyred Intellectual Graveyard
People from Kabirhat Upazila